Charles Ready (December 22, 1802 – June 4, 1878) was an American politician and a member of the United States House of Representatives for Tennessee's 5th congressional district.

Biography
Ready was born in Readyville in Rutherford County, now called Cannon County, on December 22, 1802. He attended the common schools and graduated from Greeneville College in Tennessee. He studied law, was admitted to the bar in 1825, and commenced practice in Murfreesboro, Tennessee.  He was married to Martha Alvoid Strong on May 19, 1825 in Knoxville, Tennessee. Their offspring were:
Charles
Aaron
Mary Emma
Horace
Martha (Mattie) (1840-1887); she married Brigadier General John Hunt Morgan as his second wife – only one of their two daughters reached adulthood yet died soon after marriage; she married secondly on 31 January 1873 in Rutherford, Tennessee, to William Henry Williamson (1828-1887), and had five children:
William Henry Williamson (b. 1873), m. Mary Ready Weaver
Martha Ready Williamson (b. 1874), m. Winstead P. Bone
Charles Ready Williamson (b. 1876)
Alice Martin Williamson (b. 1878), m. Amzi W. Hooker
Nannie Williamson (1881-1883)
(Cora) Alice
Ella Love

Career
In 1835, Ready was a member of the Tennessee House of Representatives. He was elected as a Whig to the Thirty-third Congress and re-elected as a member of the American Party to the Thirty-fourth and Thirty-fifth Congresses. He served from March 4, 1853 to March 3, 1859.  He was an unsuccessful candidate for re-election in 1858 to the Thirty-sixth Congress, and resumed the practice of law.

Death
Ready died in Murfreesboro, Tennessee on June 4, 1878 (age 75 years, 164 days). He is interred at Evergreen Cemetery.

References

External links

 
 
 http://www.tnportraits.org/images/ready-charles-large.jpg

1802 births
1878 deaths
People from Cannon County, Tennessee
Whig Party members of the United States House of Representatives from Tennessee
Tennessee Know Nothings
Know-Nothing members of the United States House of Representatives from Tennessee
19th-century American politicians
American lawyers admitted to the practice of law by reading law